The United States Attorney for the Eastern District of New York is the chief federal law enforcement officer in five New York counties: Kings (Brooklyn), Queens, Richmond (Staten Island), Nassau and Suffolk. The current U.S. Attorney is Breon Peace, who took over in October 2021.

The U.S. District Court for the Eastern District of New York has jurisdiction over all cases prosecuted and defended by the U.S. Attorney.

History
The Eastern District of New York was formed by taking away these five counties from the Southern District of New York in 1865.

List of U.S. Attorneys
Benjamin D. Silliman: 1865–1866
Benjamin F. Tracy: 1866–1877
Asa Wentworth Tenney: 1877–1885
Mark D. Wilber: 1885–1889
Jesse Johnson: 1889–1894
John Oakey: 1894
James L. Bennett: 1894–1898
George H. Pettit: 1898–1902
William J. Youngs: 1902–1915
Louis R. Bick: 1915
Melville J. France: 1915–1919
James D. Bell: 1919
LeRoy W. Ross: 1919–1921
Wallace E. J. Collins: 1921
Ralph C. Greene: 1921–1925
William A. De Groot: 1925–1929
Howard W. Ameli: 1929–1934
Leo J. Hickey: 1934 – Dec. 25, 1937 (died in office)
Harold St. Leo O'Dougherty (interim): sworn in on December 27, 1937
Michael F. Walsh: 1938–1939 (resigned, appointed Secretary of State of New York)
Vine H. Smith (interim): 1939
Harold Maurice Kennedy: 1939–1944 (resigned, appointed judge of this Court])
T. Vincent Quinn (interim): 1944–1945
Miles F. McDonald: 1945 (resigned, elected Kings County District Attorney in November 1945)
T. Vincent Quinn (interim): 1945-46
J. Vincent Keogh: 1946–1950
Frank J. Parker: 1950–1953
Leonard P. Moore: 1953–1957
Cornelius W. Wickersham, Jr.: 1957–1961
Elliot Kahaner (interim): 1961
Joseph P. Hoey: 1961–1969
Vincent T. McCarthy (interim): 1969
Edward Raymond Neaher: 1969–1971
Robert A. Morse: 1971–1973
Edward J. Boyd (interim): 1973–1974
David G. Trager: 1974–1978
Edward R. Korman: 1978–1982
Raymond J. Dearie: 1982–1986
Reena Raggi (interim): 1986
Andrew J. Maloney: 1986–1992
Mary Jo White (interim): 1992–1993
Zachary W. Carter: 1993–1999
Loretta Lynch: 1999–2001
Alan Vinegrad (interim): 2001–2002
Roslynn R. Mauskopf: September 3, 2002 – October 18, 2007
Benton J. Campbell (interim): 2007–2010
Loretta Lynch: April 22, 2010 – 2015
Kelly Currie (interim): 2015
Robert L. Capers: 2015–2017 
Bridget Rohde (acting): 2017–2018
Richard Donoghue: 2018–2020
Seth DuCharme (acting): 2020–2021
Mark Lesko (acting): Jan–Jun 2021
Jacquelyn M. Kasulis (acting): Jun 2021–Oct 2021
Breon Peace: Oct 2021–present

References

External links
United States Attorney for the Eastern District of New York Official Website

Prosecution

1865 establishments in New York (state)